Dire Dawa is a city in Ethiopia.

Dire Dawa may also refer to:

 Dire Dawa Airport
 Dire Dawa City S.C., a football club
 Dire Dawa Stadium
 Dire Dawa University